Nani Nani is an album of improvised music by American composer and saxophonist/multi-instrumentalist John Zorn (as Dekoboko Hajime) and Yamataka Eye. A sequel album Naninani II was released in 2004.

Reception
The Allmusic review by Stacia Proefrock awarded the album 4 stars stating "This album is not for Sunday afternoon relaxation, but its obvious playfulness make its more discordant elements eminently tolerable, even amusing in their cleverness".

Track listing 
 "Eep Man" - 1:07
 "Test Tube" - 3:11
 "Thank You For Not Thinking" - 2:36
 "Pulp Wars" - 2:57
 "Sticky Beethoven's Pipeline" - 1:15
 "Laughing Eskimo" - 1:28
 "Damascus" - 1:11
 "Yoga Dollar" - 5:17
 "Propolution" - 1:36
 "My Rainbow Life" - 1:44
 "Bad Hawkwind" - 18:13
 "We Live" - 0:56

 All compositions by John Zorn & Yamataka Eye

Personnel 
 Yamataka Eye - Vocals, Drums, Toys
 John Zorn - Saxophone, Harmonica, Guitar, Sitar, Sampler

References 

1995 albums
Albums produced by John Zorn
John Zorn albums
Tzadik Records albums